VF-301 Fighter Squadron 301 was an aviation unit of the United States Naval Reserve in service from 1970 to 1994. The squadron's nickname was Devil's Disciples.

History
VF-301 was activated on 1 October 1970 and assigned to Carrier Air Wing Reserve 30 (CVWR-30) (tail code "ND") at Naval Air Station Miramar, California (USA).

The squadron first flew the F-8L Crusader and later transitioned to the F-4B Phantom in 1974. Their time with the B-models was short and VF-301 soon received the F-4N in February 1975. In 1980, VF-301 received the most advanced F-4 variant in the U.S. Navy, the F-4S. In October 1984 the unit transitioned to the F-14A Tomcat. The squadron made its first deployment with the F-14A on 21 April 1985, with five aircraft visiting MCAS Yuma, Arizona for air-to-air training against U.S. Marine Corps F-21A Kfir fighters of Marine Fighter Training Squadron 401 (VMFT-401). At this time, the squadron was still transitioning to the F-14 and it was not until 4 August the same year the entire squadron was able to deploy to NAS Fallon, Nevada for air wing training.

Later in its life the squadron became the first Naval Air Reserve squadron to drop air-to-ground ordnance, specifically Mk 84 bombs and Mk 20 cluster munitions.

After 24 years of service VF-301 was disestablished on 11 September 1994, the same time as sister squadron VF-302, due to post-Cold War budget cuts where the Navy opted to sacrifice Reserve F-14 squadrons to keep Regular Navy F-14 squadrons operating. Deactivation of the rest of CVWR-30 was soon to follow. During these 24 years VF-301 had acquired an outstanding safety record, flying 71,322.4 hours without a Class A mishap, setting a new record for Navy tactical jet squadrons.

See also
History of the United States Navy
List of inactive United States Navy aircraft squadrons
List of United States Navy aircraft squadrons

References

External links
VF-301 History

Strike fighter squadrons of the United States Navy